Reicher may refer to:

People
 Emanuel Reicher (1849–1924), German actor
 Emanoil-George Reicher (1930–2019), Romanian chess player
 Frank Reicher (1875–1965), German actor, director and producer
 Hedwiga Reicher (1884–1971), German actress
 Louis Joseph Reicher (1890–1984), bishop of the Roman Catholic Diocese of Austin
 Steve Reicher, professor of social Psychology and head of the School of Psychology at the University of St Andrews

Education
 Reicher Catholic High School, Waco, Texas

Religion
 Reicher Synagogue, Łódź, Poland